Ángel Matías (born July 30, 1976) is a volleyball player from Puerto Rico, who was a member of the Men's National Team that ended up in second place at the 2007 Pan-American Cup in Santo Domingo, Dominican Republic. There he was named Best Defender of the tournament.

Individual awards
 2007 Pan-American Cup "Best Defender"

References
 FIVB Profile

1976 births
Living people
Puerto Rican men's volleyball players
Place of birth missing (living people)